Hungary competed at the 1992 Summer Olympics in Barcelona, Spain. 217 competitors, 159 men and 58 women, took part in 156 events in 23 sports.

Medalists

Competitors
The following is the list of number of competitors in the Games.

Archery

After missing the 1984 and 1988 archery competition, Hungary returned in 1992.  The nation was represented by three women, only one of whom advanced to the elimination rounds.  She won her first match before falling in the second round.

Women's Individual Competition:
 Judit Kovacs — Round of 16, 16th place (1-1)
 Marina Szendei — Ranking round, 35th place (0-0)
 Timea Kiss — Ranking round, 54th place (0-0)

Women's Team Competition:
 Kovacs, Szendei, and Kiss — Round of 16, 15th place (0-1)

Athletics

Men's 400 metres
Tamás Molnár

Men's 10,000 metres
Zoltán Káldy
 Heat — 28:21.96
 Final — 28:34.21 (→ 12th place)

Men's Marathon
 Gyula Borka — 2:20.46 (→ 38th place)
 Csaba Szűcs — did not finish (→ no ranking)

Men's 20 km Walk
 Sándor Urbanik
 Final — 1:26:08 (→ 8th place)

Men's Pole Vault
István Bagyula

Men's Long Jump
László Szalma 
 Qualification — 7.47 m (→ did not advance)

Csaba Almási 
 Qualification — 7.69 m (→ did not advance)

Men's Hammer Throw
Tibor Gécsek 
 Qualification — 76.48 m
 Final — 77.78 m (→ 4th place)

Men's Discus Throw
Attila Horváth 
 Qualification — 62.26 m
 Final — 62.82 m (→ 5th place)

József Ficsór 
 Qualification — 58.84 m (→ did not advance)

Men's Decathlon
Dezső Szabó 
Sándor Munkácsy

Women's 200 metres
Ágnes Kozáry

Women's 400 metres
Judit Forgács

Women's Marathon
 Karolina Szabó — 2:40.10 (→ 11th place)

Women's 4×400 metres Relay
 Edit Molnár 
 Ágnes Kozáry 
 Éva Baráti
 Judit Forgács

Women's 10 km Walk
Mária Urbanik
 Final — 45:50 (→ 12th place)

Ildikó Ilyés
 Final — 45:54 (→ 13th place)

Andrea Alföldi
 Final — 46:35 (→ 18th place)

Women's High Jump
 Judit Kovács 
 Qualification — 1.90 m (→ did not advance)

Women's Long Jump
 Rita Ináncsi

Women's Javelin Throw
 Kinga Zsigmond 
 Qualification — 60.74 m 
 Final — 56.54 m (→ 10th place)

Women's Heptathlon
 Rita Ináncsi

Badminton

Boxing

Men's Light Flyweight (– 48 kg)
 Pál Lakatos
 First Round — Defeated Vladimir Ganzcenko (EUN), RSC-2
 Second Round — Defeated Dong-Bum Cho (KOR), 20:15 
 Quarterfinals — Lost to Daniel Petrov (ROM), 8:17

Men's Lightweight (– 60 kg)
 János Petrovics
 First Round — Lost to Moses Odion (NIG),

Canoeing

Cycling

Four cyclists, three men and one woman, represented Hungary in 1992.

Men's road race
 Csaba Steig
 Károly Eisenkrammer

Men's points race
 Miklós Somogyi

Women's road race
 Éva Izsák — 2:29:22 (→ 51st place)

Diving

Women's 3m Springboard
 Ágnes Gerlach
 Preliminary Round — 265.86 points (→ did not advance, 18th place)

Women's 10m Platform
Ibolya Nagy
Preliminary Round — 269.52 points (→ did not advance, 21st place)

Brigitta Cserba
Preliminary Round — 236.10 points (→ did not advance, 27th place)

Equestrianism

Mixed Jumping Individual
Vilmos Göttler

Mixed Three-Day Event Individual
Attila Soós, Jr.
Tibor Herczegfalvy 
Attila Ling
Zsolt Bubán

Mixed Three-Day Event Team
Attila Soós, Jr.
Tibor Herczegfalvy 
Attila Ling
Zsolt Bubán

Fencing

20 fencers, 15 men and 5 women represented Hungary in 1992.

Men's foil
 Zsolt Érsek
 István Busa
 Róbert Kiss

Men's team foil
 István Busa, Zsolt Érsek, Róbert Gátai, Róbert Kiss, Zsolt Németh

Men's épée
 Iván Kovács
 Krisztián Kulcsár
 Ferenc Hegedűs

Men's team épée
 Iván Kovács, Krisztián Kulcsár, Ferenc Hegedűs, Ernő Kolczonay, Gábor Totola

Men's sabre
 Bence Szabó
 Csaba Köves
 György Nébald

Men's team sabre
 Bence Szabó, Csaba Köves, György Nébald, Péter Abay, Imre Bujdosó

Women's foil
 Zsuzsa Némethné Jánosi
 Gertrúd Stefanek
 Ildikó Nébaldné Mincza

Women's team foil
 Gabriella Lantos, Ildikó Nébaldné Mincza, Zsuzsa Némethné Jánosi, Ildikó Pusztai, Gertrúd Stefanek

Gymnastics

Women’s Team

Henrietta Ónodi

Andrea Molnár

Bernadett Balázs

Kinga Horváth

Ildikó Balog

Krisztina Molnár

Handball

Men's team competition
Preliminary round (group A)
 Hungary — South Korea 18-22
 Hungary — Brazil 21-27
 Hungary — Iceland 16-22
 Hungary — Sweden 21-25
 Hungary — Czechoslovakia 18-20
Classification Match
 7th/8th place: Hungary — Romania 23-19 (→ Seventh place)

Team roster
Imre Biró
Attila Borsos
Otto Csicsay
István Csoknyai
József Éles
Ferenc Füzesi
Sándor Györffi
Attila Horváth
Mihály Iváncsik
László Marosi
Richard Mezei
Zsolt Perger
Jakab Sibalin
László Sótonyi
János Szathmári
Igor Zubjuk
Head coach: Attila Joosz

Judo

Modern pentathlon

Three male pentathletes represented Hungary in 1992. Attila Mizsér won a silver medal in the individual event.

Individual
 Attila Mizsér
 László Fábián
 Attila Kálnoki Kis

Team
 Attila Mizsér
 László Fábián
 Attila Kálnoki Kis

Rhythmic gymnastics

Rowing

Sailing

Shooting

Swimming

Men's 100 m Freestyle
 Béla Szabados
 Heat — 50.78 (→ did not advance, 20th place)

Men's 200 m Freestyle
 Béla Szabados
 Heat — 1:52.50 (→ did not advance, 27th place)

 Zoltán Szilágyi
 Heat — DSQ (→ did not advance, no ranking)

Men's 400 m Freestyle
 Zoltán Szilágyi
 Heat — 3:56.68 (→ did not advance, 20th place)

Men's 1500 m Freestyle
 Zoltán Szilágyi
 Heat — 15:52.80 (→ did not advance, 21st place)

Men's 100 m Backstroke
 Tamás Deutsch
 Heat — 56.47
 B-Final — 56.70 (→ 13th place)

 Olivér Ágh
 Heat — 59.02 (→ did not advance, 41st place)

Men's 200 m Backstroke
 Tamás Deutsch
 Heat — 2:00.50
 Final — 2:00.06 (→ 7th place)

 Olivér Ágh
 Heat — 2:04.52 (→ did not advance, 27th place)

Men's 100 m Breaststroke
 Norbert Rózsa
 Heat — 1:02.25
 Final — 1:01.68 (→  Silver Medal)

 Károly Güttler
 Heat — 1:02.28
 B-Final — 1:01.84 (→ 9th place)

Men's 200 m Breaststroke
 Norbert Rózsa
 Heat — 2:12.95
 Final — 2:11.23 (→  Silver Medal)

 Károly Güttler
 Heat — 2:14.31
 Final — 2:13.32 (→ 5th place)

Men's 100 m Butterfly
 Péter Horváth
 Heat — 56.09 (→ did not advance, 35th place)

Men's 200 m Individual Medley
 Tamás Darnyi
 Heat — 2:01.29
 Final — 2:00.76 (→  Gold Medal)

 Attila Czene
 Heat — 2:02.05
 Final — 2:01.00 (→  Bronze Medal)

Men's 400 m Individual Medley
 Tamás Darnyi
 Heat — 4:18.34
 Final — 4:14.23 (→  Gold Medal)

 Attila Czene
 Heat — 4:26.31
 B-Final — 4:21.28 (→ 9th place)

Men's 4 × 100 m Medley Relay
 Tamás Deutsch, Norbert Rózsa, Péter Horváth, and Béla Szabados
 Heat — 3:43.61
 Final — 3:42.03 (→ 6th place)

Women's 400 m Freestyle
 Judit Kiss
 Heat — 4:24.01 (→ did not advance, 24th place)

Women's 800 m Freestyle
 Judit Kiss
 Heat — 8:58.16 (→ did not advance, 18th place)

Women's 100 m Backstroke
 Krisztina Egerszegi
 Heat — 1:00.85
 Final — 1:00.68 (→  Gold Medal)

 Tünde Szabó
 Heat — 1:02.14
 Final — 1:01.14 (→  Silver Medal)

Women's 200 m Backstroke
 Krisztina Egerszegi
 Heat — 2:07.34
 Final — 2:07.06 (→  Gold Medal)

 Tünde Szabó
 Heat — 2:13.81
 Final — 2:12.94 (→ 6th place)

Women's 100 m Breaststroke
 Gabriella Csépe
 Heat — 1:10.58
 Final — 1:10.19 (→ 6th place)

Women's 200 m Breaststroke
 Gabriella Csépe
 Heat — 2:32.04 
 B-Final — 2:31.15 (→ 9th place)

Women's 400 m Individual Medley
 Krisztina Egerszegi
 Heat — 4:43.83
 Final — 4:36.54 (→  Gold Medal)

Table tennis

Tennis

Men's Singles Competition
 László Markovits
 First round — Lost to Mark Koevermans (Netherlands) 2-6, 3-6, 6-2, 2-6

Men's Doubles Competition
 László Markovits and Sándor Noszály
 First round — Lost to George Cosac and Dinu Pescariu (Romania) retired

Water polo

Men's team competition
Preliminary round
 Tied with Italy (7-7)
 Defeated Cuba (12-11)
 Lost to Spain (5-8)
 Defeated Greece (12-7)
 Tied with the Netherlands (13-13)
Classification Matches
 Defeated Germany (8-7)
 Lost to Australia (8-9) → Sixth place

Team roster
Tibor Benedek
István Dóczi
András Gyöngyösi
Péter Kuna
Gábor Nemes
Imre Péter
Zsolt Petõváry
Gábor Schmiedt
Frank Tóth
Imre Tóth
László Tóth
Zsolt Varga
Balázs Vincze
Head coach: György Horkai

Weightlifting

Men's Bantamweight (– 56 kg)
Tibor Karczag
Ferenc Lénárt

Men's Featherweight (– 60 kg)
Attila Czanka

Men's Light-Heavyweight (– 82.5 kg)
László Barsi
István Mészáros

Men's Middle-Heavyweight (– 90 kg)
István Dudás
István Halász

Men's Heavyweight I (– 100 kg)
Andor Szanyi

Men's Heavyweight II (– 110 kg)
László Németh
Tibor Stark

Wrestling

References

Nations at the 1992 Summer Olympics
Olympics
1992